Troy Luff (born 22 November 1969) is a former Australian rules footballer for the Sydney Swans of the Australian Football League.

Football career
Troy Luff grew up in the town of Traralgon, Victoria, where he lived until high school age.  He played junior football with the Cumberland Park Club before shifting with his family to Nelson Bay, New South Wales. In 1989 with 70 goals he was the leading goalkicker in the Newcastle AFL for Nelson Bay.

In his early career, Luff was delisted and re-drafted twice before the age of 26, and was considered again at the start of his breakout year, 1996, by coach Rodney Eade

1996 season
Luff was retained, where he became best known for his stand-out performances in the 1996 AFL Finals series, culminating in a near best on ground effort in the 1996 AFL Grand Final with 2 crucial goals in the losing side, where he soundly beat Wayne Schwass (although was later beaten by Glenn Archer). Luff also suffered from 
Epstein Barr virus.

Later career
The tall, lean Luff managed to hold down his ruck position during his career, playing a total of 155 games and kicking 85 goals in a career spanning from 1990 to 2001.

Post-AFL career
Luff joined Balmain and won a Phelan medal and club best and fairest in 2002. He later became coach and player of UNSW-Eastern Suburbs Bulldogs and went on to win a second Phelan Medal in 2006. Luff returned to play for Balmain, and then back to UNSW-ES where he won his first Grand Final in his 551st game played in 2019.

Luff also commentates for Triple M Sydney's AFL coverage and is a regular on Weekend Sunrise and Fox Sports News

References

External links

Sydney Swans players
1969 births
Australian rules football commentators
Living people
People from Traralgon
Australian rules footballers from Victoria (Australia)
UNSW-Eastern Suburbs Bulldogs players
Balmain Australian Football Club players